Grant Sitton (born April 27, 1993) is an American professional basketball player for Saitama Broncos of the Japanese B.League. Standing at 2.06 m (6 ft 9 in), he usually plays at the power forward position.

College career
Sitton played college basketball for Clackamas Community College in the 2013–14 season and University of Victoria from 2014 until 2017. In the 2015–16 season, Sitton averaged 14.4 points and 4.9 rebounds per game, while shooting 82.7% from the free throw line. In the 2014–15 season, Sitton helped lead Victoria to the CanWest championship and the CIS Final 8 Tournament semifinals.

Professional career
In 2017, Sitton signed his first professional contract with Slowakian side Prievidza. He played 37 games in the Slovak Basketball League, averaging 14.2 points and 4.8 rebounds per game.  

On July 19, 2018, Sitton signed a one-year deal with Donar, defending champions of the Dutch Basketball League (DBL). With Donar, he reached the round of 16 of the FIBA Europe Cup. In the DBL, the team finished as runners-up. 

On July 23, 2019, Sitton signed a one-year contract with Rostock Seawolves of the German ProA.

On July 19, 2021, Sitton signed with Panthers Schwenningen.

References

External links
Profile at realgm.com
Victoria Vikes Profile

1993 births
Living people
American expatriate basketball people in Canada
American expatriate basketball people in the Netherlands
American expatriate basketball people in Germany
American expatriate basketball people in Slovakia
American men's basketball players
Basketball players from Washington (state)
BC Prievidza players
Donar (basketball club) players
Junior college men's basketball players in the United States
Power forwards (basketball)
Rostock Seawolves players
Saitama Broncos players
Sportspeople from Vancouver, Washington
Victoria Vikes basketball players